The Homeland Security Advisory Council (HSAC) is part of the Executive Office of the President of the United States. It was created by an Executive Order on March 19, 2002.

Council members

References

2002 establishments in the United States
Executive Office of the President of the United States